Jacques "Jacky" Planchard (born 3 February 1947) is a French former professional football player and manager.

Early life 
Jacques Planchard was born on 3 February 1947 in Tours, Centre-Val de Loire. 

Planchard was a big fan of horses before becoming a footballer; he was a jockey in the 1960s, and also become an equestrian instructor.

Career 
Planchard arrived at Paris Saint-Germain from Blois in 1973 at the age of 26. He made his first appearance for the club in a 0–0 draw against Mulhouse on 24 February 1974. Planchard was notably the goalkeeper who played in both of the play-off matches between PSG and Valenciennes, helping the Parisian club reach the Division 1. Paris lost the away match by a score of 2–1, but made a comeback in the second leg after being 2–4 down on aggregate, eventually winning the match 4–2 and the tie 5–4.

On 9 August 1974, Planchard started for PSG in a match against Reims; he conceded 6 goals in 45 minutes as the match ended in a 6–1 victory for Reims, which would be Planchard's final match of his professional football career.

Planchard suffered a fracture to his leg while playing with Lille, which put an end to his career. He became a player-manager for amateur clubs Amboise and Saint-Cyr-sur-Loire. In 1981, he became a PE teacher, before training youth players at Joué-lès-Tours.

After football 
After football, Planchard worked in the transportation sector of the company Europe-Express. He retired in March 2007.

Career statistics

References 

1947 births
Living people
Sportspeople from Tours, France
French footballers
Association football goalkeepers
Blois Football 41 players
Paris Saint-Germain F.C. players
Lille OSC players
Ligue 1 players
Ligue 2 players
French football managers
AC Amboise players
Association football player-managers
Footballers from Centre-Val de Loire